T Bone Burnett is an album by T Bone Burnett, released in 1986. It was his only release on the Dot label.

T Bone Burnett was reissued in 1995 by Universal Special.

Track listing
All tracks written by T Bone Burnett; except where indicated
 "River of Love" – 3:30
 "Poison Love" (Elmer Laird) – 2:33
 "Shake Yourself Loose" – 3:00
 "No Love at All" (David Mansfield, Billy Swan) – 2:54
 "Annabelle Lee" (Bob Neuwirth) – 5:01
 "I Remember" (instrumental) – 2:21
 "I Remember" – 3:39
 "Little Daughter" – 3:29
 "Oh No Darling" – 3:49
 "Time" (Tom Waits) – 3:59
 "Little Daughter" (instrumental) – 3:23
 "Song to a Dead Man" (Burnett, Larry Poons) – 3:34
 "The Bird That I Held in My Hand" (Burnett, Neuwirth, Swan) – 3:04

Personnel
T Bone Burnett – vocals, guitar
Jerry Douglas – dobro, lap steel guitar
Byron Berline – fiddle
Steve Duncan – drums
David Hidalgo – guitar, accordion, vocals, 8-String Bass
Jerry Scheff – bass
Billy Swan – vocals

References

1986 albums
T Bone Burnett albums